Mallasamudram is a small town in Thiruchengode taluk, Namakkal district in the Indian state of Tamil Nadu. It is the headquarter of the Mallasamudram block. Mallasamudram is also known as "Mallai village", "Mallai".

Geography
Mallasamudram is about 25 km from Salem on the Salem - Tiruchengode Road, via Attayampatti. It has an average elevation of 22048 metres.

Demographics
 India census, Mallasamudram had a population of 17,125. Males constitute 51% of the population and females 49%. Mallasamudram has an average literacy rate of 62%, higher than the national average of 59.5%: male literacy is 70%, and female literacy is 53%. In Mallasamudram, 10% of the population is under 6 years of age. The town has many temples. It has a famous Lord Shiva temple which is 1000 years old.

Economy
The major occupation of the people is textile Hand loom weaving, Agriculture & hotel .

Health
Government primary health center is situated in Mallasamudram to Pallipatti Main Road, Mallasamudram.

Education
There are elementary, primary, secondary as well as higher secondary schools in Mallasamudram. Mallasamudram has three private engineering colleges and a polytechnic college.

Mahendra Engineering colleges,
Mahendra Polytechnic college,
Mahendra Arts & Science college.
AKV Matriculation School
AKV CBSE School
Govt Boys Hr.Sec school
Govt Girls Hr.Sec school

Distances

Tiruchengode -20 km

Namakkal -41 km

Rasipuram - 24 km

Salem - 25 km

Erode - 41 km

Sankagiri - 22 km

References

Cities and towns in Namakkal district